Denman Maroney (born 1949) is a jazz musician who plays what he calls "hyperpiano".  Hyperpiano "involves stopping, sliding, bowing, plucking, striking and strumming the strings with copper bars, aluminum bowls, rubber blocks, plastic boxes and other household objects." This is sometimes done with one hand while the other hand is used to play the keys.

He received a grant from the National Endowment for the Arts for his work and worked on a new soundtrack to go with The Cabinet of Dr. Caligari.

References

External links
Indie jazz
Denman Maroney's website

American jazz pianists
American male pianists
Living people
1949 births
Place of birth missing (living people)
20th-century American pianists
21st-century American pianists
20th-century American male musicians
21st-century American male musicians
American male jazz musicians